The New Alchemy Institute was a research center that did pioneering investigation into organic agriculture, aquaculture and bioshelter design between 1969 and 1991. It was founded by John Todd, Nancy Jack Todd, and William McLarney. Its purpose was to research human support systems of food, water, and shelter and to completely rethink how these systems were designed.

Purpose of the Institute

Their stated aim was to do research on behalf of the planet: "Among our major tasks is the creation of ecologically derived human support systems - renewable energy, agriculture, aquaculture, housing and landscapes. The strategies we research emphasize a minimal reliance on fossil fuels and operate on a scale accessible to individuals, families and small groups. It is our belief that ecological and social transformations must take place at the lowest functional levels of society if humankind is to direct its course towards a greener, saner world.
Our programs are geared to produce not riches, but rich and stable lives, independent of world fashion and the vagaries of international economics. The New Alchemists work at the lowest functional level of society on the premise that society, like the planet itself, can be no healthier than the components of which it is constructed. The urgency of our efforts is based on our belief that the industrial societies which now dominate the world are in the process of destroying it." (Fall 1970, Bulletin of the New Alchemists. )

Areas of research

Bioshelters

A bioshelter is a solar greenhouse that is managed as a self-contained ecosystem.  The groupings of plants, animals, soil and insects are selected so that closed loops of life cycles, materials, water, and energy are created, and require minimal inputs from outside the system.  They emulate natural rhythms of growth and cycling of nutrients.

New Alchemy built several bioshelters:

 "The Ark" located at the property in Hatchville, Massachusetts, United States
 "The Ark" located at Spry Point, Prince Edward Island, Canada
 others

Organic agriculture
New Alchemy investigated the practices of organic agriculture for both field crops, and greenhouse growing. They researched intensive gardening, biological pest control, cover cropping, irrigation using fish pond water, perennial food crops, and tree crops.

Aquaculture
New Alchemy experimented with growing edible fish  in ponds in the bioshelters. The fertile pond water was used for irrigating the crops in the greenhouses. This proved to be a successful way to raise edible fish, floating hydroponic crops, and irrigated greenhouse food crops.

Ideological basis
The scientists working at New Alchemy were determined to rethink how human support systems were designed. They looked to nature as the ultimate designer, using careful observation of natural cycles and processes as the template for creating truly sustainable systems.

Publications
The research conducted at New Alchemy was documented in a series of journals and technical bulletins.  A complete list is available at: New Alchemy Institute

References

External links
 New Alchemy Institute
Ocean Arks International

Environmental research institutes
Research institutes in Massachusetts
Research institutes in Canada